Kyle Edward Gibson (born May 22, 1987) is an American professional basketball player who last played for Hapoel Galil Elyon of the Israeli Premier League. He played college basketball for the Louisiana Tech Bulldogs.

Biography
He played college basketball at Louisiana Tech (2006–2010).

Gibson signed with Budućnost on July 6, 2017. He inked with Beşiktaş on August 28, 2018.

On August 20, 2019, he signed with Boulazac Basket Dordogne of the LNB Pro A. Gibson averaged 11.8 points and 2.6 assists per game. On November 6, 2020, he signed with Śląsk Wrocław of the Polish Basketball League. Gibson joined the Brujos de Guayama in Puerto Rico in 2021, but left the team in August. 

On August 21, 2021, he signed with Hapoel Galil Elyon of the Israeli Premier League.

The Basketball Tournament
Kyle Gibson played for Team CitiTeam Blazers in the 2018 edition of The Basketball Tournament. In two games, he averaged 18.5 points per game, 4.5 rebounds per game and 2.0 assists per game. CitiTeam Blazers made it to the Second Round before falling to Team Challenge ALS.

References

External links
Proballers Profile
Eurobasket Profile
RealGM Profile
ABA League Profile
Euroleague Profile
Eurocup Profile
NBADraft Profile

1987 births
Living people
ABA League players
American expatriate basketball people in Belgium
American expatriate basketball people in France
American expatriate basketball people in Italy
American expatriate basketball people in Montenegro
American expatriate basketball people in Turkey
American men's basketball players
Basketball players from Los Angeles
BC Oostende players
BCM Gravelines players
Beşiktaş men's basketball players
Canton Charge players
Hapoel Galil Elyon players
KK Budućnost players
Louisiana Tech Bulldogs basketball players
Pallacanestro Virtus Roma players
Pistoia Basket 2000 players
Shooting guards
Śląsk Wrocław basketball players
Susan Miller Dorsey High School alumni